Chan Man Hei (born 2 November 1981) is a Macanese footballer who plays as a midfielder for GD Lam Pak.

References 

1981 births
Living people
Macau footballers
Macau international footballers
G.D. Lam Pak players
Association football midfielders